Daş Salahlı is a village and the most populous municipality in the Qazakh District of Azerbaijan, aside from the capital Qazakh. It has a population of 8,411.

References 

Populated places in Qazax District